Gabi is a 2012 South Korean film starring Kim So-yeon, Joo Jin-mo and Park Hee-soon. It follows an ostensible assassination plot of King Gojong (1852-1919), using coffee brewed by royal barista Tanya. The plan is masterminded by Sadako, a Joseon woman with adopted Japanese nationality, and aided by Ilyich, Tanya's lover.

Inspired by conspiracy theories about Gojong and the king's well-known love of coffee, the movie's title Gabi is a turn-of-the-century Chinese-character transliteration of "coffee." The film is based on author Kim Tak-hwan's historical fiction novel Noseoa Gabi ("Russian Coffee").

Plot
After his wife Empress Myeongseong is assassinated by the Japanese army and under threat of coup d'etat, Gojong the 26th king of Korea's Joseon Dynasty (Park Hee-soon) briefly seeks refuge at the Russian consulate in 1896. While he is there, he tastes and falls in love with a bittersweet drink that had yet to gain popularity in his homeland: coffee.

Upon returning to the throne, King Gojong hires the beautiful and cosmopolitan Tanya (Kim So-yeon) as his personal barista. Tanya becomes involved in a dangerous social circle that involves not only the Russian sniper Ilyich (Joo Jin-mo) but also the mysterious socialite known as both Bae Jeong-ja and Sadako (Yoo Sun). With the Russian army hot on their trail, Tanya and her lover Ilyich eventually become ensnared in a plot to assassinate King Gojong that is orchestrated by Sadako, a Korean-Japanese collaborator. Ilyich becomes a spy to protect Tanya, who has begun to fall for Gojong while she makes his coffee every day.

With her intimate connection to the King, making a drink that could easily conceal poison, Tanya must decide if she will become a pawn in the political battlefield of late 19th century Korea.

Cast
Kim So-yeon as Tanya
Joo Jin-mo as Ilyich
Park Hee-soon as King Gojong
Yoo Sun as Sadako
Jo Deok-hyeon as Seok-joo
Jo Kyeong-hun as underling
Kim Hyun-ah as court lady
Kim Ga-eun as Geum-hee
Kim Eung-soo as Miura
Jo Seung-yeon as Min Young-hwan
Jo Duk-je as spy
Kim Min-hyuk as Takeda
Hong Young-geun as Ryosuke
Um Hyo-sup as Tanya's father

Historical basis
Born into a lowly background, Kim Hong-ryuk rose up in the ranks to be appointed as an interpreter for King Gojong in the latter's dealings with the Russian minister Karl Ivanovich Weber. Eventually his political ambition proved his undoing, and he was executed for allegedly trying to poison Gojong by spiking a cup of coffee with opium.

Casting change
Lee Da-hae was originally cast in the lead role of Tanya via verbal agreement, but when she dropped out of the project ten days before filming began, production company Ocean Film sued her for breach of contract. In September 2012, the court ruled in favor of the plaintiff, ordering Lee to pay  in damages, or 40% liability.

Awards
2012 Korean Culture and Entertainment Awards: Excellence Award, Actress in a Film - Kim So-yeon
2014 Golden Cinema Festival: Gold Medal in Cinematography - Oh Hyun-je

References

External links 
  
  
 Gabi at Naver 
 
 
 

2012 films
South Korean mystery films
South Korean historical films
South Korean spy films
Films about politicians
Films set in 1896
Films set in the Joseon dynasty
Films set in Seoul
Films based on South Korean novels
Films based on thriller novels
Films directed by Chang Yoon-hyun
Cinema Service films
2010s Korean-language films
2010s South Korean films